Giovanni Emmanuel Uribe, (born February 17, 1984) is a Mexican universal visual artist and poet. During 2009-2013 he studied at York University in Toronto, Ontario, where he earned his BA (Hons). At York University he met the Canadian art critic Ken Carpenter who introduce him to the Czech-Canadian abstract painter Joseph Drapell. For two years Uribe was Drapell's assistant. Drapell taught him, his compression technique, which he developed at the Cranbrook Academy of Art in Michigan in 1969. Uribe is the creator of the art movement named Universalism or Universal Depiction; a movement based on the creative potential of the collective unconscious, the cosmos, fourth dimension, spirituality and an active connection with all the previous art movements, old Mexican cultures and science. He currently lives in Mexico City.

References

1984 births
Living people
People from Mexico City
20th-century Mexican painters
Mexican male painters
21st-century Mexican painters
20th-century Mexican male artists
21st-century Mexican male artists